Xenophrys zunhebotoensis is a species of frog in the family Megophryidae from Nagaland, India, where it is known only from a single site in Nguti (Sukhalu), Zunheboto District.

References

zunhebotoensis
Endemic fauna of India
Amphibians of India
Amphibians described in 2007